Homes Under the Hammer is a British factual renovation and auction television series that is screened on BBC One as part of the morning schedule. The series has been running since 17 November 2003, and is currently presented by Martin Roberts and Martel Maxwell alongside Dion Dublin, Jacqui Joseph, and Tommy Walsh. Lucy Alexander, the series' original presenter, departed the series in 2016, though new episodes featuring Alexander were broadcast intermittently until 2022.

The series is the BBC's most successful show among others in the 10 am slot, regularly attaining a 30% market share for new episodes, which equates to approximately 1.5 million viewers per episode.

Presenters
Since the first series in 2003, Lucy Alexander and Martin Roberts presented the show, though guest presenters Jasmine Birtles and Marc Woodward also presented a handful of episodes during series three, due to the limited availability of the regular presenters. Retired footballer Dion Dublin joined Alexander and Roberts in 2015 at the beginning of the nineteenth series.

On 1 July 2016, the BBC announced that Alexander had stepped down from her role on Homes Under the Hammer after 13 years, though Alexander later clarified that she would continue to appear on the series for "at least another few years", owing to the manner in which the series is filmed. On 30 March 2017, BBC Scotland's Martel Maxwell was revealed as the new host replacing Alexander during the 21st series of the show and it was announced she would appear on screen from June.

In November 2020, the BBC announced that Money for Nothing presenter Jacqui Joseph and former Ground Force presenter Tommy Walsh would join the presenting team for series 24. This series was broadcast from 2021.

Format
Commercial and industrial property also feature on the programme in addition to residential lots and land plots.

Each episode follows several lots at auction. These often require refurbishment or full development. A presenter and local estate agent provide a valuation of the property, followed by the actual auction and sale price. The buyers discuss potential improvements to the purchased property, with an estimated budget. Following this format for each property, the show returns to show the refurbishments carried out. Another estate agent gives an updated value of the property following the work.

In 2019, the show also started returning to unfinished properties featured in past episodes to give updates on their progress.

Music
During the stages of viewing the property, or whilst interviewing the buyer, music is normally played which is related to the property, or person buying. London-based composers Michael Burdett and Richard Cottle created the theme tune, stings, and musical beds for Homes Under the Hammer.

Transmissions

References

External links
 
 

2003 British television series debuts
2000s British television series
2010s British television series
2020s British television series
BBC Television shows
English-language television shows
Home renovation television series
Property buying television shows
Television series by All3Media